Spas-Nurma is a rural locality (a village) in Rostilovskoye Rural Settlement, Gryazovetsky District, Vologda Oblast, Russia. The population was 3 as of 2002.

Geography 
Spas-Nurma is located 21 km south of Gryazovets (the district's administrative centre) by road. Dor is the nearest locality.

References 

Rural localities in Gryazovetsky District